Khin Moe Nwe (born ) is a Burmese weightlifter, competing in the 58 kg category and representing Myanmar at international competitions. 

She participated at the 2000 Summer Olympics in the 58 kg event. She competed at world championships, most recently at the 1999 World Weightlifting Championships.

Major results

References

External links
 
 
 http://www.news24.com/xArchive/Archive/Myanmars-Olympic-hope-women-20000829
 

1973 births
Living people
Burmese female weightlifters
Weightlifters at the 2000 Summer Olympics
Olympic weightlifters of Myanmar
Place of birth missing (living people)
Weightlifters at the 1998 Asian Games
Weightlifters at the 2002 Asian Games
Asian Games medalists in weightlifting
Asian Games silver medalists for Myanmar
Medalists at the 2002 Asian Games
Southeast Asian Games gold medalists for Myanmar
Southeast Asian Games medalists in weightlifting
Competitors at the 2001 Southeast Asian Games